"Don't Play That Song (You Lied)" is a song written by Ahmet Ertegun and Betty Nelson, the wife of soul singer Ben E. King. It was first recorded by King and was the title track on his third album Don't Play That Song! (1962). The song reached number 2 on the U.S. R&B singles chart and number 11 on the pop chart when released as a single on Atco Records in 1962. In Europe, it ranked at #10 in Italy on FIMI National Charts between 1962 and 1963.

Aretha Franklin covered the song for her nineteenth studio album, Spirit in the Dark, released on Atlantic Records in 1970. Her version, performed with the Dixie Flyers, was released as a single in 1970 and peaked at number 1 for five weeks on the R&B singles chart and number 11 on the pop chart. Franklin's version was certified gold with sales over a million copies. It reached number 13 on the UK Singles Chart. This was the first of two covers Franklin did of songs made popular by King. The other was her cover of "Spanish Harlem" in 1971.

Other acts to have recorded or performed the song include Keith Locke and The Quests, Peppino di Capri, Adriano Celentano in 1977 and Mariah Carey. It was also performed to great acclaim on the first season of American Idol by Kelly Clarkson, the eventual winner. More recently Sam Moore duetted the song with Bekka Bramlett on his 2006 album Overnight Sensational. The British soul singer Beverley Knight included a cover of the song on her 2016 album Soulsville.

In 1962, the French singer Johnny Hallyday released a single with a French adaptation of the song under the title Pas Cette Chanson !

Bruce Springsteen recorded the song for his 2022 album, Only the Strong Survive.

References

1962 singles
1970 singles
1977 singles
Ben E. King songs
Aretha Franklin songs
Songs written by Ahmet Ertegun
1962 songs
Atco Records singles